Tahkovuori or Tahko is a resort in the middle of Finland, in Kuopio. It is about 70 kilometers north of the city centre and is open all year round.

Tahko is a small tourist town with many restaurants and outdoor activities, including winter sports facilities. Nearby Nilsiä and Northeast Savonia have hundreds of kilometers of marked routes for snowmobile use. 

There are also numerous marked paths for hiking and mountain biking. Nilsiä has a well-equipped marina; Lake Syväri and Lake Vuotjärvi are renowned for their fish stocks. One may also fish in the Lastukoski rapids.

Tahko also has many sports services, clubs for people of different ages, a modern sports field, two full-length golf courses, a sports hall, tennis courts, and other sports premises.

An abandoned strip mining area nearby is nowadays a venue for opera performances.

The proposed plan of artificially increasing the height of the Tahkovuori hill has raised much debate in Finland.

Accommodations
There are 8,500 beds in the resort in vacation homes, apartment hotels, and hotels.

External links 
 Tahko.com
 Activity review
 Local photography
 More local photography

Resorts in Finland
Hills of Finland
Kuopio
Buildings and structures in Kuopio